Zo'é (Jo'é) is spoken by the indigenous Zo'é people of Pará, Brazil. It is close to the Emerillon language. 

Zo'é is also known as Buré, Poturu, Poturujara, and Tupí of Cunimapanema.

Notes

Tupian languages
Indigenous languages of Central Amazonia